The 2019 Tottori gubernatorial election was held on 7 April 2019 to elect the next governor of Tottori.

Candidates 
Shinji Hirai* back by LDP, CDP, Komeito, DPFP.
Hideyuki Fukuzumi for the JCP.
Hiroshi Inoue.

Results

References 

2019 elections in Japan
Gubernatorial elections in Japan
April 2019 events in Japan
Politics of Tottori Prefecture